Subodh Das was an Indian politician belonging to Communist Party of India (Marxist). He was elected as a member of Tripura Legislative Assembly from Panisagar eight consecutive times.

Biography
Das was born on 1 September 1947 in Habiganj, Sylhet to Bihari Das and Nolini Das. Later they moved to Tripura.

Das became a member of Communist Party of India (Marxist) in 1965. He served as a member of Tripura Legislative Assembly from Panisagar from 1977 to 2018. He also served as Panchayet Minister of Tripura Government from 1993 to 2004. He was a member of Communist Party of India (Marxist) Committee of Tripura from 1978 to 2013.

Das died on 24 February 2019 in G. P. Pant Hospital, Agartala.

References

1947 births
2019 deaths
Communist Party of India (Marxist) politicians from Tripura
Bengali politicians
People from Habiganj District
State cabinet ministers of Tripura
Tripura MLAs 1977–1983
Tripura MLAs 1983–1988
Tripura MLAs 1993–1998
Tripura MLAs 1998–2003
Tripura MLAs 2003–2008
Tripura MLAs 2008–2013
Tripura MLAs 2013–2018